WNSV (104.7 FM, "V104.7") is a radio station broadcasting an adult contemporary format. Licensed to Nashville, Illinois, the station serves the areas around Centralia, Illinois, Breese, Illinois and Nashville, Illinois.

References

External links
WNSV's official website

NSV